Scrobitasta is a genus of moth in the family Gelechiidae. It contains the species Scrobitasta varians, which is found in Argentina.

References

Gnorimoschemini